Diacetyl monoxime is a chemical compound described by the formula CH3C(O)C(NOH)CH3. This colourless solid is the monooxime derivative of the diketone butane-2,3-dione (also known as diacetyl and biacetyl).  Its biological effects include inhibiting certain ATPases.

Preparation
The compound can be prepared from butanone by reaction with ethyl nitrite. It is an intermediate in the preparation of dimethylglyoxime:

Uses
Diacetyl monoxime can be used with thiosemicarbazide to selectively detect small amounts of urea in the presence of other nitrogen-containing compounds.

References

Ketoximes
Chelating agents